Parramatta Hospital Archaeological Site is a heritage-listed archaeological site at Marsden Street, Parramatta, City of Parramatta, New South Wales, Australia. It was added to the New South Wales State Heritage Register on 2 April 1999.

History 

It includes remains of the second convict hospital (1792-1818) and John Watts' third convict hospital (1818-1844), as well as other remains such as a convict hut, surgeon's residence and associated artefacts.

It was excavated in the 2000s as part of the Parramatta Justice Precinct development. The archaeological remains were incorporated into a new courtyard as part of the new development. Two pavilions were established to house exhibits and interpretation panels, and other aspects of the site were capped with a protective slab. The project won an Architects Australia Award for heritage work in 2008.

Heritage listing 
The Parramatta Hospital Archaeological Site was listed on the New South Wales State Heritage Register on 2 April 1999. It is of historical and archaeological significance as a record of convict settlement of the site dating back to 1790. This site is one of the first settled urban sites in Australia.

See also

 Parramatta Archaeological Site
 Parramatta Justice Precinct

References

Bibliography

Attribution

External links

New South Wales State Heritage Register
Buildings and structures in Parramatta
Archaeological sites in New South Wales
Articles incorporating text from the New South Wales State Heritage Register
1818 establishments in Australia
Defunct hospitals in Australia